The Tale of the Princes of Vladimir is an early 16th-century Muscovite treatise which propounds the conception of Moscow as the Third Rome. It has been attributed either to Dmitry Gerasimov or Pachomius the Serb, among other learned monks.

The book traces the male-line descent of Muscovy's royal family not only from Rurik, but from a certain Prus, to whom his uncle, Emperor Augustus, gave the northern part of the world, which later came to be known as "Prussia". These claims to imperial heritage are further shored up by the story of Monomakh's Cap, a purported imperial crown which Constantine IX Monomachos of Byzantium is supposed to have presented to his grandson, Vladimir Monomakh, and which was used at coronations in Muscovy.

The treatise provided the ideological background for Ivan IV's coronation as the first Russian Tsar and inspired Athanasius, Metropolitan of Moscow, to compile the famous Book of Degrees. The Tsar's place for praying in the Dormition Cathedral of the Moscow Kremlin was decorated with a set of bas-reliefs illustrating The Tale.

References

External links 
 Text of the treatise

16th century in the Grand Duchy of Moscow
Early Russian literature
Propaganda books and pamphlets
Genealogical fraud
Legacy of the Roman Empire